Mark Hunter (born May 26, 1977) is an American musician best known as the former vocalist of heavy metal band Chimaira.

Early life
Hunter was born in Parma Heights, Ohio, on May 26, 1977.

Career
Hunter started Chimaira in 1998. The band has sold over a million albums worldwide and have debuted on the  Billboard 200 Chart six times. 2013's Crown of Phantoms debuted at number 54 selling over 7,400 copies in its first week of release. Hunter was one of the main songwriters for Chimaira and considered the band leader. He is also credited in the album liner notes for assisting with guitars, artwork concepts and album production.

He was the only original member of Chimaira after departures in 2010 and 2011. Cleveland Scene nicknamed Hunter "Metal Moses" in 2002 for his popularization of the Wall of Death

Influences

Hunter has cited Stanley Kubrick, Gaspar Noé, Trent Reznor, and Slayer to be among some of his influences. Some inspiration for lyrical content was drawn from Hunter's love of movies. Beyond the Black Rainbow, Fire Walk with Me, and The Shining have been mentioned in numerous interviews.

Personal life
Hunter practiced Muay Thai and was featured in the July 2008 edition of Fight! Magazine, and the April 2009 edition of MMA Weekly.

Chimaira and director Nick Cavalier released the documentary Down Again in 2018, in which Hunter shares his struggle with bipolar disorder as well as his interest in photography.

Hunter was diagnosed with thyroid cancer but is now in remission after a full thyroidectomy.

Writing and blogs
Hunter wrote regular columns for Revolver magazine and GunShyAssassin. Some of topics included meditation, travel, and nutrition. He also penned the liner notes for The Best of Mercyful Fate.

Social media
In 2011, Hunter took to his Twitter and Facebook accounts to discuss his frustration with the music industry resulting in praise from fellow musicians and journalists. 
Metal Sucks – Why You Should Be Following Mark Hunter
Metal Insider – Mark Hunter Discusses His Twitter Outburst

Discography

Chimaira
This Present Darkness EP
Pass Out of Existence
The Impossibility of Reason
Freddy vs. Jason (soundtrack)'ChimairaResurrectionThe InfectionComing AliveThe Age of HellCrown of PhantomsPrevious bands and guest work
Guitarist and vocalist for hardcore band Skipline (1995–1997)
Guitarist for stoner rock band High Point (2003)
Guitarist for The Demonic Knights of Aberosh 
Backing vocals on "In the Face of the Faceless" by Forever in Terror on the album Restless in the TidesVocals on "13 Years" by Stemm on the album Songs for the Incurable HeartVocals on "The Enemy" on the album Roadrunner UnitedVocals on "Mask of the Damned" by The Elite on the World War 3 EP
Vocals on "Faith Destroyed" by Excellent Cadaver on the album Faith DestroyedVocals on "Desert Dread" by Ghost Iris on the album ComatoseVocals on "Parasite" by Bleed the Sky for their newest single. (02-2023)

Production creditsThe Impossibility of Reason (co-producer)Chimaira The Infection (co-producer)The Age of Hell (co-producer)Crown of Phantoms DVD'' (assistant camera/editor)

References

1977 births
Living people
American heavy metal singers
American heavy metal musicians
Nu metal singers
Musicians from Cleveland
Chimaira members
People from Parma Heights, Ohio
21st-century American singers
21st-century American male singers